Sri Lankan Americans are Americans of full or partial Sri Lankan ancestry. Sri Lankan Americans are persons of Sri Lankan origin from various Sri Lankan ethnic backgrounds. The people are classified as South Asian in origin.

History
Sri Lankans started arriving in the U.S. around the mid 1950s in larger numbers, but there is evidence from U.S. census records of Sri Lankans having arrived in earlier years from Ceylon mostly between the 1880s and 1890s.

In 1975, Sri Lankan immigrants were classified for the first time as belonging to a category separate from "other Asian". In that year, 432 Sri Lankans entered the United States.

According to the U.S. Immigration and Naturalization Service records, in 1996, 1,277 Sri Lankans were naturalized. This included 615 who had arrived in 1995 and 254 who had arrived in 1994, compared with only 68 arrivals in 1993 and 17 before 1985.

The number increased to 14,448 in the 1990s in conjunction with the Sri Lankan Civil War. Sri Lankan Americans settled largely in cities.

Demographics

The New York City Metropolitan Area, including New York City, Long Island, and Central New Jersey, contains the largest Sri Lankan community in the United States, receiving the highest legal permanent resident Sri Lankan immigrant population, followed by the Los Angeles metropolitan area.

Little Sri Lanka, in the Tompkinsville neighborhood of the borough of Staten Island in New York City, is one of the largest Sri Lankan communities outside of the country of Sri Lanka itself. As of 2019, Sri Lankans were coalescing on Staten Island. Staten Island alone has been estimated as home to more than 5,000 Sri Lankan Americans.

Around 40% were born in the United States, while only a half are U.S. citizens.

Socioeconomics 
Sri Lankan Americans are generally educated and affluent. With a median income of $74,000, Sri Lankan Americans are the third most successful Asian American group (tied with Japanese Americans) in regards to income. Additionally, 57% of Sri Lankan Americans over the age of 25 have a bachelor's degree or more.

Organizations
 Association of Sri Lankans in America (AHRCL)
 Friends of Sri Lanka in the United States
 Sri Lanka America Association of Southern California (SLAASC)
 Sri Lanka Association of New England (SLANE)
 Sri Lanka Foundation
 Sri Lankan American Association of Houston
 Sri Lankan American Cultural Association (SLACA)
 Sri Lankan Youth Organization (SLYO) 
The Association of Sri Lankan Muslims in North America (TASMiNA)

Notable people

See also

 Minnesota Buddhist Vihara
 Mahamevnawa Buddhist Meditation Center of New York
 American Chamber of Commerce in Sri Lanka
 Asian Americans
 Sri Lankan diaspora
 Sri Lanka–United States relations

Notes and references

External links
 Sri Lankan Americans
 US Census 2000 foreign born population by country
 Sri Lanka: Background and U.S. Relations

Asian-American society
 
 
Sri Lankan diaspora
South Asian American